Luzuriaga is a genus of flowering plants in the family  Alstroemeriaceae. It is native to New Zealand, Chile, Argentina and the Falkland Islands.

SpeciesMoreno, R., C. Le Quesne & A. Muñoz. 2010. Extensión de la distribución geográfica de Luzuriaga marginata Benth & Hook. f. y Ourisia coccinea (Cav) Pers. subsp. elegans (Phil.) Reiche, en Chile. Chloris Chiilensis Año 12. Nº 2. 

 Formerly included

References

Alstroemeriaceae
Liliales genera
Taxa named by José Antonio Pavón Jiménez